Papaflessas (before 1915: Κοντογόνι - Kontogoni) is a village and a former municipality in Messenia, Peloponnese, Greece. Since the 2011 local government reform it is part of the municipality Pylos-Nestoras, of which it is a municipal unit. The municipal unit has an area of 42.137 km2. Population 1,316 (2011). The seat of the municipality was in Vlachopoulo.

It comprises five communities (τοπική κοινότητα): Vlachopoulo, Metamorfosi, Maniaki, Papaflessas, and Margeli. It was named after the Greek priest and revolutionary Papaflessas.

References

Populated places in Messenia